The 1930 South Carolina gubernatorial election was held on November 4, 1930, to select the governor of the state of South Carolina. Ibra Charles Blackwood won the contested Democratic primary and ran unopposed in the general election becoming the 97th governor of South Carolina.

Democratic primary
The South Carolina Democratic Party held their primary for governor in the summer of 1930 and it attracted many politicians because of the change in 1926 to the South Carolina constitution providing for a four-year term. Blackwood emerged victorious from the closely contested runoff against Olin D. Johnston and effectively became the next governor of South Carolina because there was no opposition in the general election.

General election
The general election was held on November 4, 1930, and Ibra Charles Blackwood was elected the next governor of South Carolina without opposition on account of South Carolina's effective status as a one-party state. Being a non-presidential election and few contested races, turnout was the second lowest ever for a gubernatorial election in South Carolina.

 

|-
| 
| colspan=5 |Democratic hold
|-

See also
Governor of South Carolina
List of governors of South Carolina
South Carolina gubernatorial elections

References

"Supplemental Report of the Secretary of State to the General Assembly of South Carolina." Reports of State Officers Boards and Committees to the General Assembly of the State of South Carolina. Volume I. Columbia, South Carolina: 1931, p. 10.

External links
SCIway Biography of Governor Ibra Charles Blackwood

1930 United States gubernatorial elections
1930
Gubernatorial
November 1930 events